Fgura is a town in the South Eastern Region of Malta. It has a population of 13,066 as of 2021. Its northern fringes are bordered by the Cottonera Lines of fortifications while it merges with the towns of Żabbar to the east and Paola and Tarxien to the West. A modern settlement, Fgura expanded to the outskirts of the Grand Harbour area and was one of the fastest-growing towns of Malta. Fgura has grown to become one of the foremost commercial areas in the central-southern part of the island. Today, Fgura has one of the highest population densities in the country.

Name and symbols 
The name Fgura comes from the surname of the Ficura family who owner land and lived in the area when it was a rural village.

The coat-of-arms of Fgura is made up of a red horizontal stripe containing three golden 5-pointed stars, centred across a white background. Fgura Day was established by the local council in 1994, and its first celebration was held on 30 October. It is now celebrated on the last Sunday of October.

The patron saint of Fgura is Our Lady of Mount Carmel and an annual feast in her honour is celebrated on the second Sunday of July. Fgura also has one of the most peculiar shaped churches in Malta, built in the shape of a tent.

History
It is thought that a settlement where Fgura currently lies existed in Phoenician times. Between 28 October and 2 December 1948, six Phoenician tombs were found in Fgura, dating to the 3rd or 4th century B.C. These tombs were in irregular shapes and human skeletons, remains of animals, pottery and other Bronze materials and objects were found. In Fgura, a street was named 'Triq is-Sejba Punika' - in English 'Phoenician Discovery Street' - in honour of this historic finding.

Before World War II, Fgura was a rural village which consisted of a few scattered farm-houses, of which there remains practically nothing, situated near the new church, near the new school and in St. Thomas Street. There were 20 families and the people of this town were farmers. 
After the Second World War, the Carmelite Fathers were entrusted with the spiritual needs of the community. The Carmelite Fathers arrived in Fgura on 14 December 1945, where they built a new church and convent, which were inaugurated in November 1950, in the presence of Prime Minister Enrico Mizzi. Before Fgura was declared a parish on 21 January 1965, it was a suburb of Tarxien.

Lying inland from the Three Cities, Fgura was influenced by the growth of the Malta Dockyards, especially after World War II. Much of Fgura was built around the 1960s and 1980s. 
As the population grew, the need arose for the building of a new modern church. The new church was inaugurated on 25 May 1988 and was consecrated by Archbishop Joseph Mercieca on 1 February 1990.

Fgura Local Council
Local Councils in Malta were established through legislation in Parliament in July 1993. The first local election in Fgura was held on 16 April 1994, and successive elections were held every three years on the 2nd Saturday of March. The first mayor of Fgura was Anthony Degiovanni. He was replaced by Saviour Camilleri in 1997, but returned to his post on 1 April 2000. However Anthony Degiovanni resigned from office in 2004, and was succeeded by Darren Marmara.  
 
The 6th Fgura Local Council elections were held on 6 June 2009. The incumbent mayor, Darren Marmara was confirmed for the 3rd consecutive time. However, on 7 July 2010 the deputy mayor Anthony Degiovanni together with his fellow labour councillors presented a no confidence motion in the incumbent mayor, Darren Marmara. The motion was due to be discussed on 16 July, but when the local council meeting was about to commence, the mayor resigned from office, saying that in the preceding days, he and his family received various threats. No official reason was given why the mayor was forced to resign. A meeting to elect a new mayor, scheduled for 21 July had to be postponed till 3 August, after a decision by the Department of Local councils, that found that there were irregularities in the way the meeting was summoned. Newcomer Byron Camilleri, a 23-year-old law student was nominated as the fourth mayor of Fgura.

Byron Camilleri was confirmed mayor for a second term, after the elections held on 9 March 2013, but eventually resigned his seat, after he was elected in Parliament in June 2017. Pierre Dalli succeeded Byron Camilleri, and was reconfirmed as Mayor in May 2019 after obtaining the majority of votes. The new deputy mayor is Clayton Portelli Cascun. The other members of the council are: Charles Bonello, Raymond Deguara, Ryan Ellul, Mario Fava, Mark Lombardo, Toshera Schembri and Adrian Tanti. Mark Lombardo is the only councillor who was elected in all local council elections held since they were established in 1993.

Places of interest

Parish Church of Our Lady of Mount Carmel 

The parish church of Fgura was built in 1988 and dedicated to Our Lady of Mount Carmel on 1 February 1990, on a project by architect Victor Muscat Inglott and structural engineer Godfrey Azzopardi from the 1960s. The parish church is built in modern, post-Vatican II Council style, with a ceiling supported at four points to provide a symmetrical cross design, while retaining a square plan at the base across both axis. It was meant to be appreciated as a free-standing structure surrounded by open space. The Fgura parish church is included in the 2011 National Inventory of the Cultural Property of the Maltese Islands under ID 00009.

The Cross Monument

There is a monument in Hompesch Street, which is known as 'Il-Monument tas-Salib' by the Fgura residents (The Cross Monument). This monument was inaugurated by Minister Ugo Mifsud Bonnici in February 1990, exactly when Fgura celebrated its 25th anniversary when it became a parish in 1965. This monument was designed by the sculptor Ġanni Bonniċi and built by apprentices of the Ġlormu Cassar School.

This monument was placed on the exact spot where a small church dedicated to Our Lady of Mount Carmel was built in 1790 instead of a niche that was there for a long time. The church was demolished in the 1950s to allow the widening of the road. As a remembrance of this niche, a new niche was built in Carmel Street.

The monument rests on four columns and they have a significant meaning. Three of these columns represent the towns which Fgura is adjacent to:- Paola, Tarxien and Żabbar {limits from these places were taken in order to form the Parish of Fgura in 1965}. The other one represents the Parish of Fgura. At the base of this monument there are 4 gravestones. They represent the 25th anniversary since Fgura became a parish, the inauguration of this monument and one is a copy of another gravestone that was situated at the side of a church that was built in 1844. This gravestone was written in Latin and it told the story of this church.

Reggie Miller Square 
Reggie Miller Square (Wesgħa Reggie Miller) is an open space decorated with palm trees to the right side  of the Parish Church. The original site had been developed into a garden which was inaugurated on 28 March 1976 by Minister Lorry Sant. Reggie Miller was a trade unionist and the founder of the General Workers' Union, the strongest trade union in Malta. The original garden featured a fish pond and a sundial designed by Paul Ignatius Micallef. Fgura Local Council, on being established in 1993, had identified this space as one if its first projects and very soon developed it into an open plan square to the design of Vice Mayor Saviour Camilleri. The new square was inaugurated on 10 February 1996. In 1996 the Fgura Local Council erected a monument of Our Lady of Mount Carmel, which was designed and executed by Fgura sculptor Alfred Camilleri Cauchi.

Patri Redent Gauci Gardens 

This garden was built in 2000 by the Ministry of Social Policy as part of the scheme of Gardens in Government Housing Estates. Fr Redent Gauci who was one of the original Carmelite friars that had started the Carmilte Community in Fgura, was eventually ordained Bishop. The Council had intended this garden to be family leisure grounds and have incorporated a multipurpose court, a club house, and a playing field. The garden was inaugurated by Minister Lawrence Gonzi. As part of the embellishment works within the Housing Estate, the Local Council embellished also the immediate surroundings of the nearby apartments, both from its annual allocation, together with other funds from parking schemes by the Malta Environment and Planning Authority.

George Stevens Square 
On 6 September 1986, the 35th anniversary of the foundation of the Malta Literary Society, Minister Lorry Sant inaugurated a monument commemorating George Stevens, poet, author of various popular songs and co-founder of the Literary Society. A hardline Malta Labour Party member by family tradition and a very intelligent man also self-made millionaire, Prof. George Stevens was a well loved character in the port area. Even though much controversy surrounds the facts of an Italian diplomat's murder whom Stevens confessed to. Still he was a hero to most in the southern part of Malta so a monument was erected The monument, erected in a square bearing his name, was commissioned by the Malta Literary Society  and executed by sculptor Alfred Camilleri Cauchi. After the unveiling it was blessed by the Parish Priest Father Guido Micallef O. Carm. In 2000, the Fgura Local Council commissioned architect Stefan Buontempo to redesign this square and entrusted the original sculptor with the restoration of the monument and the design a new plinth. The project was inaugurated in 2001 in the presence of the Stevens family and members of the Malta Literary Society, by the President of Malta Guido de Marco.

Wied Blandun 

Wied Blandun is the only natural area included in the limits of Fgura, and one of the few remaining open spaces in the con­urbation around the Three Cities. It lies immediately outside the western part of the Cottonera bastions and south of the Bormla drydocks. Wied Blandun is part of the drowned valley system of the Grand Harbour area; with a length of circa 500 metres, it is irrigated by rainwater run-off from the streets of Paola and Fgura. It comprises terraced fields and the area closest to the road which leads to Fgura includes an important stand of carobs and almonds. The valley has long been subject to important environmental degradation, being used in its lower (northern) part as dumping ground for hazardous grit blasting waste from the nearby shipyards. 

In November 2001 the Malta Environmental and Planning Authority scheduled Wied Blandun for its scientific and ecological importance among the Protected areas of Malta. 
In 2015 the Maltese government allocated €125,000 for an environmental study for the rehabilitation of the valley, to include a desk study, a site description and a preliminary risk assessment, with the aim of the rehabilitation and restoration of Wied Blandun, as confirmed by Paola MP Silvio Parnis, head of the consultative council for the south of Malta.

A EU-funded catchment management study and masterplan were published in December 2020 and March 2021 respectively.

Fgura United Football Club
Fgura United is the local football club and it officially represents the locality of Fgura in Maltese football. In 2012, Fgura Utd FC were promoted to the Second Division, after an eventful season for the local sports club. This was the second time that the club was promoted to a higher division, after the first success registered in the season 1987/88. On 31 March 2012, the Fgura Utd Sports complex was inaugurated by Prime Minister Lawrence Gonzi and UEFA President, Michel Platini.

16 July External Feast Commission
The External Feast Commission 16 July, or as it is better known in Maltese; Kummissjoni Festa Esterna 16 ta' Lulju is under the auspices of the Fgura Parish Church. This Commission was founded in 1993 under the auspices of Fr. Adrian Cassar Pulis O.Carm. Different activities are held during the year as a means of fund raising.  These funds are spent on the expenses incurred in organizing the village feast on the second Sunday of July.  The Village Feast of Fgura is dedicated to Our Lady of Mount Carmel.
On 5 March 2018, Kummissjoni Festa Esterna celebrated 25 years of success and work to organise the village feast in Fgura.

Scout Group

The Fgura Scout Group formed in 1987 is a member of the South District of the Scout Association of Malta. They currently have about 100 Uniformed Members in 4 Co-ed Sections. A Beaver section (ages 5–7) a Cub Scout section (ages 7–10), a Troop Section (ages 10–15), a Venture Unit ages (15-18) and a Rover Crew for older scouts. The Group also has a Band made up from scouts over 10 years. Apart from the local and national activities, the Group also participates in overseas activities and frequently hosts the First Woodend Scout Group of Bristol-UK for their traditional exchange visits.
In 2005, 11 scouts and 1 leader attended EuroJam 2005 (European Jamboree) in Chelmsford, UK this year being the 100th anniversary of scouting.
In November 2017, the Fgura Scout Group had its 30 years anniversary. Also in the same month they made a special group camp for the occasion instead of the usual winter camp. In 2019 the scouts aged between 11 and 17 years had the opportunity to go to the Haarlem Jamborette, held in Haarlem, Spaarnwoude, The Netherlands.

Band Club
Our Lady of Carmel Society and Band Club (L-Għaqda Mużikali u s-Soċjali Madonna tal-Karmnu) was founded in 1985. Its premises in Hompesch Road were inaugurated in 1991. Teaching of musical instruments for free is one of the main goals of this band club, whilst the Band takes active part in the organisation of all local festivities throughout the year, and which reach their climax during the second week of July, when the titular feast of Our Lady of Mount Carmel is celebrated.

Zones in Fgura

Wied Blandun
Tal-Liedna
Ta' Ġerman
Ta' Penza
Ta' Tira
Tal-Foss
Tal-Gallu
Tal-Patri
Tax-Xemx u l-Qamar
Taz-Zilfa

References

External links 

Fgura Scouts
M.U.S.E.U.M. Boys Fgura

 
Towns in Malta
Local councils of Malta